Cody White (born November 28, 1998) is an American football wide receiver for the Pittsburgh Steelers of the National Football League (NFL). He played college football at Michigan State.

Early life and high school
White was born and grew up in Novi, Michigan and attended Walled Lake Western High School, where he was a member of the baseball, basketball, football, and track teams. As a senior he played the first three games of the season at quarterback due to an injury to the team's starter, passing for 638 yards and nine touchdowns and finished the season with 43 catches for 705 yards and nine touchdowns while also rushing for 576 yards and seven touchdowns and won  Michigan's Mr. Football Award.

College career
White played for the Michigan State Spartans for three seasons. He set a school record for true freshmen with 490 receiving yards on 35 catches and scored four touchdowns. White missed four games due to injury as a sophomore but still led the Spartans with 555 receiving yards on 42 receptions with two touchdown catches. As a junior, White led Michigan State with 66 receptions for 922 yards and six touchdowns. Following the end of the season he announced that he would forgo his senior season to enter the 2020 NFL Draft. White finished his collegiate career with 143 catches for 1,967 yards and 12 touchdowns.

Professional career

Kansas City Chiefs
White signed with the Kansas City Chiefs as an undrafted free agent on April 25, 2020, shortly after the conclusion of the 2020 NFL Draft. He was waived by the Chiefs on July 29, 2020.

New York Giants
White was signed by the New York Giants on August 11, 2020. He was waived six days later on August 17.

Denver Broncos
White was signed by the Denver Broncos on August 23, 2020. He was waived on September 5, 2020, during final roster cuts.

Pittsburgh Steelers
White was signed to the Pittsburgh Steelers' practice squad on September 24, 2020. He remained on the practice squad for the remainder of the 2020 season and signed a reserve/futures contract with the team on January 14, 2021. White was waived on August 31, 2021, at the end of training camp but was re-signed to the Steelers' practice squad. He was elevated to the active roster on September 26, 2021, for the team's week 3 game against the Cincinnati Bengals and made his NFL debut in the game, catching two passes for 17 yards in a 24–10 loss. White was signed to the Steelers' active roster on October 9, 2021.

On August 30, 2022, White was waived by the Steelers and signed to the practice squad the next day. He signed a reserve/future contract on January 10, 2023.

Personal life
White's father, Sheldon White, played defensive back in the NFL for six seasons and was a member of the Detroit Lions front office for 19 seasons before joining Michigan State's coaching staff.

References

External links
Michigan State Spartans bio
Pittsburgh Steelers bio

1998 births
Living people
American football wide receivers
Michigan State Spartans football players
Players of American football from Michigan
Kansas City Chiefs players
Pittsburgh Steelers players
New York Giants players
Denver Broncos players